Schoenobius sagitella is a moth in the family Crambidae. It was described by George Hampson in 1896. It is found in Brazil.

References

Moths described in 1896
Schoenobiinae
Fauna of Brazil
Moths of South America